Charles de Vilmorin is a French designer. He graduated from the École de la Chambre Syndicale de la Parisienne. In April 2020, at the age of 23, he launched his eponymous label on Instagram during the COVID-19 pandemic, and quickly attracted the attention of other designers. His designs are seen as abstract, mixing a lot of different techniques. He was nominated for both the LVMH Prize and ANDAM. For LVMH, he is one of the nine finalists for the 2021.

Education 

 De la Chambre Syndicale de la Courture Parisienne
French Institute of Fashion

Early life & origin 
Charles de Vilmorin was inspired by his family heritage of botanists, evident in his patterns and depictions of flowers, and aspires to follow the foot steps of his parents and grandparents. It is also worth mentioning that he is the great nephew of French novelist, poet and journalist Louise de Vilmorin.

Career 
In April 2020, Charles de Vilmorin launched his first collection at just 23 years old. He was struggling to find an internship at first, and simultaneously a mysterious buyer purchased all of his creations, which allowed him to fund his first collection.
Shortly after, he was named creative director of Rochas. 
His fall collection contained quilted jackets, with features of experimentation with body paint and neon makeup. 
His original designs are distinct by their vibrant nature, hand-painted artwork, and puffy silhouettes.

Exhibition & Collections 

 Haute Couture SS 2021
 Spring Summer 2022 Show

Accomplishment 

 Nominated LVMH Prize
 Nominated ANDAM

References

External links 
 

Designers
French designers
Year of birth missing (living people)
Living people